Campotenes is a genus of moths belonging to the subfamily Tortricinae of the family Tortricidae.

Species
Campotenes beryllodes (Diakonoff, 1954)
Campotenes chrysopluta (Diakonoff, 1954)
Campotenes microphthalma (Diakonoff, 1954)
Campotenes vervoorti Diakonoff, 1972

See also
List of Tortricidae genera

References

External links
tortricidae.com

Tortricidae genera